Eve Akinyi Obara is a Kenyan politician, current Member of Parliament for Kabondo Kasipul Constituency in Homabay County, and a member of Orange Democratic Movement (ODM) since 2017.

Education
Obara attended Loreto High School for her East African Certificate of Education (EACE) in 1972 and she went to Lwak Girls High School for her East African Advanced Certificate of Education (EAACA) in 1976. Between 1978 and 1981, she studied at University of Nairobi to earn a Bachelor of Arts in Sociology and Social Science, and from 1990 to 1991 attended the University of Illinois to pursue a Masters in Business Administration.

Career 
Obara was employed at the Ministry of Agriculture as a personnel officer from 1982 to 1984, and was later  employed as Deputy Managing Director, Personnel and Admin Manager from 1995 to 2007 at the Kenya Literature Bureau.

See also
 13th Parliament of Kenya

References 

Living people
Kenyan women representatives
21st-century Kenyan women politicians
21st-century Kenyan politicians
Orange Democratic Movement politicians
University of Nairobi alumni
University of Illinois Urbana-Champaign alumni
Members of the 13th Parliament of Kenya